Patricia  "Pat" (née Wright) Pariseau (August 10, 1936 – November 13, 2020) was an American nurse, politician, and a former member of the Minnesota Senate who represented District 36, which includes portions of Dakota, Goodhue, Scott and Washington counties in the southern Twin Cities metropolitan area. A Republican, she was first elected to the Senate in a 1988 special election held after the resignation of Senator Darril Wegscheid. She was re-elected in 1990, 1992, 1996, 2000, 2002 and 2006. Prior to the 1992 legislative redistricting, she represented the old District 37. On February 22, 2010, she announced that she would not seek an eighth term.

Pariseau was a member of the Senate's Environment and Natural Resources Committee, the Finance Committee, and the Judiciary Committee. She also served on the Environment and Natural Resources Subcommittee for Public Lands and Waters, and on the Finance subcommittees for the Economic Development and Housing Budget Division, the Environment, Energy and Natural Resources Budget Division, and the Environment, Energy and Natural Resources Budget Division-Natural Resources. Her special legislative concerns included taxes, health issues, agriculture, business and jobs, environment and sporting issues, airport planning, natural resources, and corrections.
She was an assistant minority leader from 1991 to 1994.

Pariseau was born in Saint Paul, Minnesota. She was a retired registered nurse. She graduated from Ravenswood Hospital School of Nursing in Chicago, Illinois. She and her late husband, Ken, farmed near Farmington, and parented six children. Before running for the Senate, she served on the Farmington School Board and also worked as an aide to U.S. Senator Rudy Boschwitz in his Saint Paul office. Pariseau died in Farmington, Minnesota and had suffered from dementia.

References

External links

Senator Pariseau Web Page
Minnesota Public Radio Votetracker: Senator Pat Pariseau
Project Vote Smart - Senator Pat Pariseau Profile
Thisweek Newspapers Profile: Senator Pat Pariseau

1936 births
2020 deaths
American women nurses
Farmers from Minnesota
School board members in Minnesota
Republican Party Minnesota state senators
People from Farmington, Minnesota
Politicians from Saint Paul, Minnesota
Women state legislators in Minnesota
21st-century American politicians
21st-century American women politicians
Deaths from dementia in Minnesota